The Beast of Gévaudan is the historic name associated with a man-eating animal or animals that terrorised the former province of Gévaudan (consisting of the modern-day department of Lozère and part of Haute-Loire as well as the Auvergne and south Dordogne areas of France), in the Margeride Mountains of south-central France between 1764 and 1767. The attacks, which covered an area spanning , were said to have been committed by one or more beasts with formidable teeth and immense tails, according to contemporary eyewitnesses. Most descriptions from the period identify the beast as a striped hyena, wolf, dog, or wolf-dog hybrid.

Victims were often killed by having their throats torn out. The Kingdom of France used a considerable amount of wealth and manpower to hunt the animals responsible, including the resources of several nobles, soldiers, royal huntsmen, and civilians. The number of victims differs according to the source. A 1987 study estimated there had been 210 attacks, resulting in 113 deaths and 49 injuries; 98 of the victims killed were partly eaten. Other sources claim the animal or animals killed between 60 and 100 adults and children and injured more than 30. The beast was reported killed several times before the attacks finally stopped.

Description
Descriptions of the time vary, and reports may have been greatly exaggerated, owing to public hysteria, but the beast was generally described as a wolf-like canine with a tall, lean frame capable of taking great strides. It was said to be the size of a calf, a cow, or, in some cases, a horse. It had an elongated head similar to that of a greyhound, with a flattened snout, pointed ears, and a wide mouth sitting atop a broad chest. The beast's tail was also reported to have been notably longer than a wolf's, with a prominent tuft at the end. The beast's fur was described as tawny or russet in color but its back was streaked with black, and a white heart-shaped pattern was noted on its underbelly.

History

Beginnings
The Beast of Gévaudan committed its first recorded attack in the early summer of 1764. A young woman named Marie Jeanne Valet, who was tending cattle in the Mercoire forest near the town of Langogne in the eastern part of Gévaudan, saw a beast "like a wolf, yet not a wolf" come at her. However, the bulls in the herd charged the beast, keeping it at bay. They then drove it off after it attacked a second time. Shortly afterward the first official victim of the beast was recorded: 14-year-old Jeanne Boulet was killed near the village of Les Hubacs near Langogne.

Throughout the remainder of 1764, more attacks were reported across the region. Very soon terror gripped the populace because the beast was repeatedly preying on lone men, women, and children as they tended livestock in the forests around Gévaudan. Reports note that the beast seemed only to target the victim's head or neck regions.

By late December 1764, rumors had begun circulating that there might be a pair of animals behind the killings. This was because there had been such a high number of attacks in such a short space of time and because many of the attacks appeared to have occurred or were reported nearly simultaneously. Some contemporary accounts suggest the creature was seen with another such animal, while others report that the beast was accompanied by its young.

On 12 January 1765 Jacques Portefaix and seven friends were attacked by the beast. After several attacks, they drove it away by staying grouped together. The encounter eventually came to the attention of Louis XV, who awarded 300 livres to Portefaix and another 350 livres to be shared among his companions. The king also rewarded Portefaix with an education at the state's expense. He then decreed that the French state would help find and kill the beast.

Royal intervention

First captain Duhamel of the Clermont Prince dragoons and his troops were soon sent to Le Gévaudan. Although extremely zealous in his efforts, non-cooperation on the part of the local herders and farmers stalled Duhamel's efforts. On several occasions he almost shot the beast, but was hampered by the incompetence of his guards. When the village of Le Malzieu was not present and ready as the beast crossed the Truyère River, Duhamel became frustrated.

When Louis XV agreed to send two professional wolf hunters, Jean Charles Marc Antoine Vaumesle d'Enneval and his son Jean-François, Captain Duhamel was forced to stand down and return to his headquarters in Clermont-Ferrand. Cooperating with d'Enneval was impossible as the two differed too much in their strategies; Duhamel organised wolf hunting parties while d'Enneval and his son believed the beast could only be shot using stealthy techniques. Father and son D'Enneval arrived in Clermont-Ferrand on 17 February 1765, bringing eight bloodhounds that had been trained in wolf hunting. Over the next four months the pair hunted for Eurasian wolves, believing that one or more of these animals was the beast. However, when the attacks continued, the D'Ennevals were replaced in June 1765 by François Antoine (sometimes wrongly identified with his son, Antoine de Beauterne), the king's sole arquebus bearer and lieutenant of the Hunt, who arrived in Le Malzieu on 22 June.

The wolf, which was named Le Loup de Chazes after the nearby Abbaye des Chazes, was said to have been quite large for a wolf. Antoine officially stated: "We declare by the present report signed from our hand, we never saw a big wolf that could be compared to this one. Hence, we believe this could be the fearsome beast that caused so much damage." The animal was further identified as the culprit by attack survivors, who recognised the scars on its body inflicted by victims defending themselves. The wolf was stuffed and sent to Versailles, where Antoine's son Antoine de Beauterne was hailed as a hero. Antoine stayed in the Auvergne woods to chase down the female partner of the beast and her two grown pups. Antoine succeeded in killing the female wolf and a pup, which seemed already larger than its mother. At the examination of the pup, it appeared to have a double set of dewclaws, a hereditary malformation found in the Bas-Rouge or Beauceron dog breed. The other pup was shot and hit and was believed to have died while retreating between the rocks. Antoine returned to Paris and received a large sum of money (over 9,000 livres) as well as fame, titles, and awards.

However, on 2 December two boys aged 6 and 12 were attacked, suggesting that the beast was still alive. The beast tried to capture the youngest, but it was successfully fought off by the older boy. Soon after, successful attacks followed and some of the shepherds witnessed that the beast showed no fear around cattle at all. A dozen more deaths are reported to have followed attacks near La Besseyre-Saint-Mary.

Final attacks
The killing of the creature that eventually marked the end of the attacks is credited to a local hunter named Jean Chastel, who shot it at the slopes of Mont Mouchet (now called la Sogne d'Auvers) during a hunt organised by a local nobleman, the Marquis d'Apchier, on 19 June 1767. In 1889, Abbot Pourcher told the edifying oral tradition which said that the pious hero Chastel shot the creature after reciting his prayers but the historical accounts do not report any such thing. The story about the large-caliber bullets, home-made with Virgin Mary's medals, is a 
literary invention by the French writer Henri Pourrat.

The body was then brought to the castle of Marquis d'Apchier, where it was necropsied by Dr. Boulanger, a surgeon at Saugues. Dr. Boulanger's post-mortem report was transcribed by notary Etienne Marin and is known as the "Marin Report" on the beast; the results of the examination were consistent with a large wolf or wolf-dog, but the remains were incomplete by the time Boulanger acquired them, precluding conclusive identification of the animal. Upon being opened, the animal's stomach was shown to contain the remains of its last victim.

Hypotheses

According to modern scholars, public hysteria at the time of the attacks contributed to widespread myths that supernatural beasts roamed Gévaudan, but deaths attributed to a beast were more likely the work of a number of wolves or packs of wolves.

Attacks by wolves were a very serious problem during the era, not only in France but throughout Europe, with thousands of deaths attributed to wolves in the 18th century alone. In the spring of 1765, in the midst of the Gévaudan hysteria, an unrelated series of attacks occurred near the commune of Soissons, northeast of Paris, when an individual wolf killed at least four people over a period of two days before being tracked and killed by a man armed with a pitchfork. Such incidents were fairly typical in rural parts of western and central Europe.

The Marin Report describes the creature as a wolf of unusually large proportions "This animal which seemed to us to be a wolf; But extraordinary and very different by its figure and its proportions of the wolves that we see in this country. This is what we have certified by more than three hundred people from all around who came to see him:"

Despite the widely held interpretation based on most of the historical research that the beast was a wolf or another wild canid, several alternative theories have been proposed, such as a lion. In a 2021 talk by François-Louis Pelissier, based on the described appearance of the animal and specific details of behaviour and what can be inferred about historical distribution, he argued that beast encounters could most likely be blamed on the Italian wolf Canis lupus italicus.

In fiction

Literature
 Nicolas-Edme Rétif de la Bretonne's 1781 novel La Découverte australe mentions "la Bête-du-Gévaudan" in passing.
 The earliest known literary reference to the Beast of Gévaudan occurs in Élie Berthet's 1858 novel La Bête du Gévaudan (translated as "The Beast of Gevaudan", but not currently available in English), in which the killings are attributed to both a wolf and a man who believes himself to be a werewolf.
 In 1904, the author and journalist Robert Sherard reworked Berthet's idea in his novel Wolves: An Old Story Retold, which once again featured both a werewolf and a huge savage wolf. Élie Berthet's La Bête du Gévaudan is mentioned in the introduction as being the source of the story.
 Robert Louis Stevenson traveled through the region in 1878 and described the incident in his book Travels with a Donkey in the Cévennes, in which he claims that at least one of the creatures was a wolf:

 In the Patricia Briggs novel Hunting Ground, the beast is in fact Jean Chastel, who is a werewolf.
 In the Jim Butcher novel Fool Moon, part of The Dresden Files, the beast is mentioned as an example of a particularly powerful and vicious type of werewolf known as a loup-garou (the French phrase for a werewolf), with the curse being hereditary. Chastel's claim of using silver bullets is also referred to as the sole weakness of the loup-garou – bullets made of inherited silver.
 In the Jun Mochizuki manga series The Case Study of Vanitas, the Beast of Gévaudan and events surrounding it are fictionalized to fit the work's  world.
 My Hero Academia features a student, Jurota Shishida, whose power "Beast" allows him to enlarge himself and gain animalistic features. His hero name, Gevaudan, is directly taken from the creature.
 Dropkick on My Devil! features one of the main characters keeping a beast of Gévaudan as a pet.
 In the 2019 R.J. Palacio graphic novel White Bird, the main character has nightmares about a fearsome wolf during her time in hiding during the Holocaust; the wolf later kills her former schoolmate, Vincent, who is working with the Nazis and has discovered her hiding place. The author notes in the book's glossary that "My inspiration for the wolf of Sara's nightmares came from the stories of the Beast of Gevaudan."

Film and television
 The beast is featured in an episode of Animal X, which suggested it was a wolf-dog hybrid that was trained to attack people.
 Brotherhood of the Wolf (2001), directed by Christophe Gans, is an action film based on the legend. In the film, the Beast is a lion dressed up in armor to mask its identity.
 The French television film La bête du Gévaudan (2003), directed by Patrick Volson, was based on the attacks of the beast.
 In October 2009, the History Channel aired a documentary, The Real Wolfman, which argues that the beast was an exotic animal, a striped hyena, a long-haired species of hyena now extinct in Europe and the likely possibility that its killer, Jean Chastel, was also the one who trained the animal in the first place, using it as a means to get back into the good graces of the Church. 
 In the 2010 remake The Wolfman, the wolf-headed cane given to Lawrence Talbot was (according to the previous owner) acquired in the city of Gévaudan.
 In the MTV drama Teen Wolf, the character Allison learns in the sixth episode of the first season that her werewolf-hunting family was responsible for slaughtering the Beast of Gévaudan. The same beast is the main focus of the second half of the series' fifth season and Crystal Reed returns as a special guest star to portray Allison's ancestor Marie Jeanne Valet, also known as, The Maid of Gévaudan .
 The beast was featured in an episode of the podcast Lore entitled "Silver Lining".
 Netflix will make a feature film produced by Blumhouse Productions.
 The Cursed, a 2022 movie set in late-19th-century France, features the beast as a gypsy curse placed on a French village.

Music 
 In May 2021, the metal group Powerwolf released the song "Beast of Gévaudan", where the titular beast is portrayed as heroic and holy: “Beast of Gévaudan, for the wrath of God to come [...] Ascent like thunder to tear down the enemies of God”.
 The metal band Morgul Blade's song "A Last Waltz of Gevaudon" describes the hunt for the beast.

See also

 List of wolves
 List of wolf attacks
 Wolf of Ansbach

 Hellhound
 Cerberus
 Barghest

References

External links
 
 Robert Darnton, The Wolf Man's Revenge, The New York Review of Books, June 9, 2011; review of Monsters of the Gévaudan: The Making of a Beast by Jay M. Smith (Harvard University Press, 2011).
 Solving the Mystery of the 18th-Century Killer “Beast of Gévaudan” (National Geographic)
 Beast of Gévaudan web site (various languages)
 

1764 in France
Canid attacks
Deaths due to wolf attacks
Events of the Ancien Régime
History of Occitania (administrative region)
Lozère
Occitania
French folklore
French legendary creatures
Individual animals in France
Individual wild animals
Individual wolves
Man-eaters
Werewolves